The Diocese of Kanyakumari is one of the 24 dioceses under the Church of South India. The diocese was constituted on 2 June 1959.

Present status

The diocese has a membership of 4,91,762 people and has assets, funds and savings of about Rs. 600 crores. The diocese has managed various mission hospitals, schools and colleges built in the early 1800s.

Bishops of the diocese
1959–1973: :I.R.H. Gnanadason (consecrated 19 December 1959)
1973–1979: C. Selvamony
1980–1997: G. Christhudhas
1997–2000: M. I. Kesari
2000–2018: Gnanasigamony Devakadasham
2019–present: AR Chelliah

Churches with Branches
Aralvaimozhi District
01 Aralvaimozhi 
02 Thovalai-Suvishesapuram
03 Santhosapuram
04 Bethel Nagar
05 Vilavilai
06 Shenbagaramanputhoor

Attoor District
01 Attoor
02 Neduvilai
03 Charoor
04 Thottavaram
05 Themanoor
06 Bharathapalli
07 Thiruvattar
08 Chevaracode
09 Kannankarai
Chirakarai District
01 Chirakarai
02 Manjalumoodu
03 Mottakalai
04 Bhavathiyoorkonam
05 Arukani
06 Nadunilaivilagam
07 Madathuvilai
 
Christ Church, Nagercoil District
01 Christ Church, Nagercoil
02 Viswasapuram
03 Puthugramam
04 Vyragudy
05 Scott Nagar
06 Sahaya Nagar
07 Christunagar
08 Wiliamspuram

Christucoil District, Palliyadi

 01 Christucoil
 02 Vazhathottam
 03 Puthenvilai
 04 Chekittavilai
 05 Thippiramalai
 06 Thittumelkonam
 07 Kuzhicode
 08 Nesapuram
 09 Mullanginavilai
 10 Thazhakkanvilai
 11 Keezhvilai
 12 Murungavilai

Devicode District01. Devicode
02 Zionparai
03 Viswasa Nagar
04 Theruvukadai
05Pootetti
06 Parakkanvilai
07 Ebenezerpuram
08
Koodavilai
09 Kadamankuzhi

Eanchacode District
01
Eanchacode
02
Kuttiyani
03
Malavilai
04
VendalicodeEathavilai District01.
Eathavilai
02
Kanjirathukonam
03
Bailispuram
04 Zionmalai
07 Vellitharavilai
06 MuttacaduIrenepuram District01
Irenepuram
02
Killiyoor
03
Deivapanavilai
04
Nellikkavilai
05
Kannayampazhanchi
06
Vilathurai
07
Marukandanvilai
08
Elavuvilai
09
Mulankuzhi
10
Vilathivilai
11
Kunnathoor
12
Thondanavilai
13
Theckanvilagam
14
Keezhkulam
15
Arulvanam
16
Painkulam
17
Ananthamangalam
18
AmsyMukaud
19
Amsy Street
20
Oottukuzhi
21
Arasakulam
22
Kunjacode
23
Munchirai
24
Puthukadai
25.
Kadencherry
26.
Iynkanthurai
Jamestown District
1.
Jamestown
2.
Bhagavathipuram
3.
Parappu vilai
4.
Levinchi puram
5.
Kannankulam
6.
Pottal Kulam
7.
Azhahappa Puram
8.
Kanimadam
9.
Kanahappapuram
10.
Anjugramam
11.
Retnapuram
Kadamalai Kuntu District
1.
Kadamalai Kuntu
2.
Pilankalai
3.
Poonthoppu
4.
Viralikattu Vilai
5.
Kannanoor
6
Vaaruvilai
7
Verkilambi
Kaliancaud District
1.
Kaliancaud
2.
Kuramony
3.
Azhaharkonam
4.
Soorankudy
5.
Melaperuvilai
6.
Keelaperuvilai
7.
Ananthanagar
8.
Christopher Nager
9.
Nesamony Nager
10.
Thammathu Konam
11.
Perinba Puram
12.
Cheruppan Codu
13.
Villukeeri
14.
Vilparayadi
15.
Ananthanadar Kudy
16.
Ananthapuram
17.
Arulpuram
18.
Eathamozhi
19.
Puthoor
20.
Kodupaikuzhi
21.
Varthahanadarkudy
Kallan Kuzhi District
1.
Kallankuzhi
2.
Pulakarai
3.
Konathuvilai
4.
Andamparai
5.
Hackerpuram
6.
Nediavilai
7.
Marankonam
8.
Poovangaparambu
9.
Meycode
10.
Valiyattumugam
11.
Pullani
12.
Pilankantuvilai
13.
Chenkody
14.
Mavaravilai
Kallukootam District
1.
Kallukootam
2.
Udayarvilai
3.
Mondaicaud
4.
Paruthivilai
5.
Kariavilai
 
Kanjikuzhi District
1.
Kanjikuzhi
2.
Vandavilai
3.
Kunjanthandalar M.C.
4.
Eluppakavilai
 
Kanjirapuram District
1.
Kanjirapuram
2.
Perumpuzhi
3.
Kuttaicaud
4.
Cherucole
5.
Kattathurai
6.
Maruthoorkurichy
7.
Thumbiyanthottam
Karungal District
1.
Karungal
2.
Thickanamcode
3.
Pullathuvilai
4.
Kottavilai
5.
Chinthenvilai
6.
Edaimalaikonam
7.
Paramananthapuram
8.
Kollanvilai
9.
Paloor
10.
Thirugnanapuram
11.
VadakkanKarai
12.
Mankarai
13.
Vattakottai
14.
Kalluvilai
15.
Kamplar
16.
Chellamkonam
17.
Kannanvilai
18.
Manalikadu
19.
MathaPuram
20.
Saral Kottai
21.
Vazhavilai
Kirthoor District
1.
Kirathoor
2.
Retnapuram
3.
Galileyapuram
4.
Kottaiketty
5.
Pallikkal
6.
Devagiri
7.
Nadaikavu
8.
Nambali
9.
Christia
10.
Pichicode
Kodiyoor District
1.
Kodiyoor
2.
Koottamavooo
3.
Azhahiamandapam
4.
Anbarpuram
5.
Pathiramangalam
6.
Ponnaravila
7.
Nangachivilai
Kottaram District
1.
Kottaram
2.
Perivilai
3.
Narikulam
4.
Muhilankudy
5.
Therkukadu
6.
Paramathanapuram
7.
Malayanvilai
8.
Agasteeswaram
9.
Kundal
10.
Leepuram
11.
Amanackanvilai
12.
Paulkulam
13.
Ottiyalvilai
14.
Periavilai West
15.
Achenkulam
16.
Mantharamputhoor
17.
Parappuvilai
18.
Santhayadi
19.
Perumalpuram
20.
Samathanapuram
21.
Kanyakumari
22.
Karumbattoor
23.
Weiravilai
24.
Ringletaubepuram
Kotticode District
1.
Kotticode
2.
Perunchilambu
3.
Thavarakuzhi
Kulasekharam District
1.
Kulasekharam
2.
Anakettyvilai
3.
Unniyyorkonam
4.
Thirunanthikari
5.
Anjukandarai
6.
Pechiparai
7.
Harrispuram
8.
Sooriyacode
9.
Peniel
10.
Thottam
11.
Ittahavilai
12.
Thirparappu
13.
Sekkal
14.
Chemmantharai Immanuel
15.
Kuppathurai
16.
Pathinettamkooru
17.
Manalivilai
18.
Mathoor
19.
Millenium
20.
Monvilai
Kuruvicaud District
1.
Kuruvicaud
2.
Padahachery
3.
Chemmantharai Christ
4.
Murambuvilai
5.
Valvuthanam
Kuttaicode District
1.
Kuttaicode
2.
Cheruvalur
3.
Vethachen Parai
4.
Peramalai
5.
Kulaparai
6.
Pallikoottam
7.
Kunnilvilai
8.
Cheruvalloor Central
9.
Puliyoor Salai
10.
Ithulli
11.
Kanjiramparai
12.
Anaimugam
13.
Malaicode
14.
Anducode
15.
Pathukani
16.
Edaicode New
17.
Nilavani
18.
Karakonam
19.
Palugal New
20.
Panichakali
21.
Soorankuzhi
Kuzhithurai District
1.
Kuzhithurai
2.
Pazhavar
3.
Mulamoottuvilai
4.
Meenachal Christ Church
5.
Palavilai- Eathavilai
6.
Kokkudivilai
7.
Kaliyakkavilai
8.
Padanthalumoodu
9.
Christu Nagar – Eruthavoor
10.
Edaivilagam
11.
Melpuram
Marthandam District
1.
Marthandam
http://www.csimarthandam.org/
2.
Kuzhithurai West
3.
Manalkuntu
4.
Ayiramthengu
5.
Kummittivilai
6.
Kannacode
7.
Malanvilai
8.
Padianvilai
9.
Panthivilai
10.
Karavilai
11.
Gnana Bethel
12.
Gnaramvilai
13.
Pacode New
14.
Kananpuram
15.
Pacode Old
16.
Perai
17.
Meadperpuram
18.
Eraviputhoor Kadai
19.
Viricode
20.
Vanian Vilai
21.
Payanam
22.
Vellamcode
23.
Gnanadasa Puram
24.
Chitheral
25.
Thickurichy
26.
Pulipanam
27.
Saral
28.
Kuttimavilai
Maruthencode District
1.
Maruthencode
2.
Nullicadu
3.
Chemmankalai
4.
Kuzhivilai
5.
Uthiramcode
6.
B.S.M. Melpuram
7.
Elanchirai
8.
Mathampalai
9.
Thaithottam
10.
Edaicode
11.
Malayadi
12.
Vanniyoor
Mathicode District
1.
Mathicode
2.
Kandukondan Manukathuvilai
3.
Mosespuram
4.
Vannanvilai Old
5.
Palapallam
6.
Anakuzhi
7.
Christupuram
8.
William Memorial
9.
Vannanvilai New
10.
Colachel
11.
Hackerpuram
12.
Panavilai
13.
Packiapuram
Moolachel District
1.
Moolachel
2.
Pattanvilai
3.
Chrode
4.
Thuckalay
5.
Horeb Panavilai
6.
Kalkurichy
7.
Devadhanapuram
8.
Brahmapuram
9.
Kadamalaikuntu Liberty
10.
Koovaraguvilai
Muzhucode  District
1.
Muzhucode
2.
Panthalvilai
3.
Mathoorkonam
4.
Muzhucode Grace
5.
Alaravilai
6.
Maruthemparai
7.
Alancholai
8.
Attukonam
9.
Arumanai Home Church
10.
Arumanai East
11.
Cheral
12.
Prahal
13.
Mannoor
14.
Arumanai North
15.
Kadayal
16.
Ambadi
17.
Arumanai Central
18.
Karode
19.
Kodayar
Mylaudy District
1.
Mylaudy
2.
Vethamanicka Nagar
3.
Manavilai
4.
Chithambarapuram
5.
Vethamanickapuram
6.
Kamaraj Nagar
7.
Kumarapuram Thoppur
8.
Amaravathi Vilai
9.
Azhanarpuram
10.
Nallur
11.
Andarkulam
12.
Kurukkalmadam
13.
Christ Church, Thamaraikualam
Nagercoil District
1.
Nagercoil Home Church
2.
Henry Puram
3.
Devasahayam Memorial Church
4.
Christupuram
5.
Aruguvilai East
6.
Edalakudi
7.
Kamarjapuram
8.
Meadpuram
9.
Pudukudi
10.
Aruguvilai
11.
Philipspuram
12.
Pallivilai
13.
Thangaraj Nager
14.
Ramavarmapuram
15.
Saraloor
16.
Irulappapuram
17.
NGO Colony
18.
Kurusady
19
vadalivilai
Neyyoor District
1.
Neyyoor
2.
Arokiapuram
3.
Melparai
4.
Vattam
5.
Periapally
6.
Authivilai
7.
Oottukuzhi
8.
Lekshmipuram
9.
Anjalipuram
10.
Seramangalam
11.
Kovilanvilai
12.
Kunnamkadu
13.
Manavalakurichy
14.
Muthalakurichy
15.
Mylode
16.
Saralvilai
17.
Bethelpuram
18.
Chemponvilai
19.
Tharavilai
20.
Nelliara Konam
Poovancode District
1.
Poovancode
2.
Surulode
3.
Bethlehem
4.
Chaicode
5.
Bethel
6.
Anayadi
7.
Retchania Puram – Anakarai
8.
Kumarakudi
Puthalam District
1.
Puthalam
2.
Chothavilai
3.
Manavalapuram
4.
Sinclairpuri
5.
Osaravilai
6.
Panickankudy
7.
Kulathuvilai
8.
Kadetty
9.
Parakai
10.
Kakkanputhoor
11.
YMCA Nager
12.
Pulluvilai
13.
Zionpuram
14.
Pillayarpuram
15.
Mela Krishnanputhoor
16.
Keela Krishnanputhoor
17.
Suviseshapuram
18.
Koilvilai
19.
Thengamputrhoor
S.T.Mankaud District
1.
S.T.Mankad
2.
Panamugam
3.
Ponnappa Nager
4.
Paulkulam
5.
Amsikkakuzhi
6.
Koottapuzhi
7.
Methukummal
Santhapuram District
1.
Santhapuram
2.
Thoppur
3.
Muttom
4.
Paul Danielpuram
5.
Suviseshapuram
6.
Ammandivilai
7.
Moongilvilai
8.
Vellamody
9.
Alanvilai
10
Kurunthencode
11
Alankottai
12
Azhahanvilai
13
Yehovahnager
14
North Kannakurichy
Seynam Vilai District
1.
Seynamvilai
2.
Chempilavilai
Thamarai Kulam District
1.
Home Church Thamaraikulam
2.
Perumal Puram
3.
West Santhayadi
4.
Elangamanipuram
5.
Kottayadi
6.
Palpanabanputhoor
7.
Punnayadi
8.
Ringle Taube Church,Thamaraikulam
Thittuvilai District
1.
Thittuvilai
2.
Marthal
3.
Arasankuzhi
4.
Wattspuram
5.
Ambulikonam
6.
Mathias Nager
7.
Gnanadasa Puram
8.
Mukkadal
9.
Kattuputhoor
10
Perunthalaicaud
11
Maultpuram
12
Madavilagam
13
Kesavaneri
14
Ettamadai
15
Paulkulam
16
Corrimony
17
Balamore
18
Vazhayathuvayal
19 Keeriparai
20 Kalikesam
21 Wills Nager
22 Thomayar Puram
23 Oorakonam
24 Nesamony Nager
25 Nainar Pothai
26 Puliyadi
27 Veerapuli
28 North Andithope
29 Thellanthi
30 South Andithope
31 Chanthavilai
32 Thazhakudy
33 Easanthimangalam
34 Mesiapuram
35 Vadasery
36 Dennispuram
37 Mantarpuram
38 VeeranimangalamVenkanji District1. Venkanji
2. Chettiavilai
3. Marshalpuram
4. Arulkuntu
5. Kula puram
6. Manali
7. Poramcode
8. Kulapuram New
9. Mankuzhi

InstitutionsHigher Secondary Schools 
 Ringeltaube  Higher Secondary School,                          Mylaudy
 Scott Christian Higher Secondary School for Boys,                Nagercoil
 Duthie Higher Secondary School for Girls,                        Nagercoil
 Home church girls Higher Secondary School,                       Nagercoil
 C.S.I. Higher Secondary School for Girls,                         Neyyoor
 C.S.I. Higher Secondary School for Girls,                         Marthandam
 C.S.I. Higher Secondary School for Boys,                          Marthandam
 C.S.I. Higher Secondary School,                                   Mathicode
 C.S.I. Higher Secondary School,                                   Jamestown
 C.S.I. Higher Secondary School,                                     Christucoil
 C.S.I. Higher Secondary School,                                    Kadamalaikuntu
 C.S.I. Higher Secondary School,                                      Zionpuram
 C.S.I. Higher Secondary School,                                       Thamaraikulam
 C.S.I. V.V. Higher Secondary School,                               Irenepuram
 C.S.I. Higher Secondary School,                                       Venkanji
 Hacker Memorial Higher Secondary School,                           NeyyoorMatriculation School C.S.I. Matriculation Higher Secondary School,                          NagercoilHigh Schools C.S.I. High School for Girls,                                            Santhapuram
 C.S.I. V. V. High School for Girls,                                      IrenepuramMiddle Schools Middle School, Kannangulam
 Middle School, Levinchipuram 
 Middle School, Eathamozhi
 Middle School, CorrimonyPrimary School Duthie Tamil Primary School,                                         Nagercoil
 Duthie Tamil Nursery School,                                         Nagercoil
 Morton (Scott) English Primary School,                               Nagercoil
 CSI Christ Tamil Primary School,                                     Kamarajapuram
 Sishu Bhavan,                                                        NagercoilSpecial School C.S.I. School for the Deaf,                                      Kottaram
 School for the Visually Handicapped,                            Irenepuram
 Bishop Gnanadason Arivu Illam,                                  Kotticode at Chithiramcode.
 C.S.I. School for Mentally Retarded,                            AlancodeArts College  Scott Christian College,                     Nagercoil | Web: www.scottchristian.org
 Nesamony Memorial Christian College,                    Marthandam | Web: www.nmcc.ac.in
 Women’s Christian College,                                Nagercoil | Web : www.wccngl.com
 Christian College of Education, Marthandam | Web: www.christiancollegeofeducation.edu.in
 C.S.I. College of Physical Education, Scott College Campus, Nagercoil | Web : Www.Ccpe.Co.InTeacher’s Training Institute C.S.I. Teacher’s Training Institute, Irenepuram | Web: www.csivvtti.orgPolytechnic College & I.T.I Moderator Gnanadason Polytechnic College, Nagercoil
 C.S.I. Vethamonickam Memorial CSI Polytechnic College, Viricode, Marthandam | Web: www.vm-csi-polytechnic.org
 C.S.I. Motor Mechanic Training Centre, Nagercoil
 C.S.I. I.T.I.,   KaliayakkavilaiCollege of Nursing & Physiotheraphy C.S.I.  School of Nursing, Neyyoor
 C.S.I.  School of Nursing, Marthandam
 C.S.I. Christian College of Nursing, Neyyoor  | Web: www.ccnneyyoor.org
 C.S.I. Christian College of Nursing, Marthandam
 C.S.I. Christian College Of Physiotheraphy, ColachelEngineering College C.S.I.  Institute Of Technology,Thovalai | www.csiit.ac.in Hospitals CSI Mission Hospital, Nagercoil
 CSI Mission Hospital, Marthandam
 CSI Medical Mission Hospital, Neyyoor
 International Cancer Centre, Neyyoor
 CSI Mission Hospital, Karungal 
 CSI Mission Hospital, Kulasekharam 
 C.P.M. Leprosy Hospital, Udayarvilai, ColachelLace Industries'''
 C.S.I. Lace & Embroidery Industry, Nagercoil
 C.S.I. Embroidery Industry, Neyyoor
 C.S.I. Embroidery Industry, Marthandam

See also

 Christianity in India
 Church of South India
 Church of North India
 Christianity in Tamil Nadu
 Kanyakumari Diocese
 Madurai-Ramnad Diocese
 Thoothukudi-Nazareth Diocese
 Diocese of Madras
 Trichy-Tanjore Diocese
 Diocese of Coimbatore
 Vellore Diocese
 Tirunelveli Diocese
 South Kerala Diocese
 Diocese of East Kerala of the Church of South India
 Madhya Kerala Diocese
 Malabar Diocese
 Kollam-Kottarakkara Diocese of the Church of South India
 Diocese of Krishna-Godavari of the Church of South India
 Karnataka Central Diocese
 Karnataka Northern Diocese
 Karnataka Southern Diocese
 Nandyal Diocese
 Rayalaseema Diocese
 Medak Diocese
 Karimnagar Diocese

References

External links
 

Kanyakumari
Christianity in Tamil Nadu
Kanyakumari
Christian organizations established in 1959
1959 establishments in Madras State